Rachel Browne (born Ray Minkoff; November 6, 1934 – June 9, 2012) was a dancer, teacher and choreographer based in Winnipeg. In 1964, she founded Canada's longest running modern dance company, Winnipeg's Contemporary Dancers, and she remained its artistic director until 1983. She remained with the company as a fundraiser and advisor, and continued to teach dance. She was awarded the Order of Canada in 1997 and the Winnipeg's Contemporary Dancers performance venue was renamed The Rachel Browne Theatre in 2008. She died in 2012 in Ottawa while visiting to watch a performance at the Canada Dance Festival.

Early life and ballet career

Browne's early dance training was in ballet. After graduating from high school, she moved to New York City to train with Robert Joffrey and Benjamin Harkarvy. Harkarvy became the artistic director of the Royal Winnipeg Ballet in 1957, and asked Browne to accompany him and become one of the company's dancers. She danced with the company until her retirement as a ballerina in 1961, citing a need to care for her young family.

Formation of Winnipeg's Contemporary Dancers

Upon her retirement, Browne began a teaching career at the Lhotka School of Ballet. At the same time, Browne began choreographing new works. Her first piece was Odetta's Songs and Dances (1964), which showcased an earthy modern dance that differed from her ballet training.

Browne formed a new dance company in 1964,  Contemporary Dancers, which later changed its name to Winnipeg's Contemporary Dancers. She took on the roles of dancer, choreographer, teacher, fundraiser and administrator for the new company. She also traveled to New York yearly to study Limón and Graham modern dance technique and acquire new dance pieces for the company. By 1970, the company was a professional dance company receiving Canada Council grants, and in 1972, Browne founded the School of Contemporary Dancers to train future modern dancers.

In 1983, pressure from her company led to Browne's resigning from it, but she continued to support it as a fundraiser and advisor. The company still continues to perform works and is the longest running Canadian modern dance company.

Post-Winnipeg's Contemporary Dancers

In the 1960s, Browne's choreography underwent a change towards simpler, feminist works. Some of her works included Mouvement in 1992 and a collaboration in 1996 with Ann Southam called Edgelit. She also created works on dancers who represented different generations with her project called Older Woman Dance.

Death

Browne died on June 9, 2012, in Ottawa during a visit to see students perform in the Canada Dance Festival.

Accolades

Browne received the Jean A. Chalmers Award for Creativity in Dance in 1995 and was awarded the Order of Canada in 1997. In 2000, she received the Canada Council Jacqueline Lemieux Prize, and in 2001, she received the Manitoba Arts Council Great-West Life Lifetime Achievement Award. In 2008, Winnipeg's Contemporary Dancers changed the name of their performance venue to The Rachel Browne Theatre.

References

1934 births
2012 deaths
Contemporary dance choreographers
Canadian choreographers
Artists from Philadelphia
Members of the Order of Canada
Canadian contemporary dancers
Canadian female dancers
Canadian women choreographers